Formula, Vol. 2 Tour was a concert tour by the Domininican American singer Romeo Santos, to promote his album Formula, Vol. 2. This concert tour was a commercial success, selling out arenas and stadiums all over America and Europe, including Yankee Stadium in New York.

Tour dates

Box Office Data

References 



2014 concert tours
2015 concert tours
2016 concert tours